Widden Brook, a partly perennial stream of the Hunter River catchment, is located in the Hunter region of New South Wales, Australia.

Course
Officially designated as a river, the Widden Brook rises on the Great Dividing Range, southwest of Nullo Mountain. Widden Brook descends  over its  course.

See also

 List of rivers of Australia
 List of rivers of New South Wales (A-K)
 Rivers of New South Wales

References

External links
 

Rivers of the Hunter Region
Muswellbrook Shire